Mahdi Falahati (born 1958) is an Iranian writer, political expert, television presenter and poet. Since May 2012, he has been presenting a TV show named Civil Society and Last Page in Voice of America Persian News Network.
Falahati joined the VOA Persian service in 2008 ,and now he works as writer and anchor for Civil Society and Last Page; a weekly show that is one of the most-viewed satellite TV programs in Iran and abroad. He formerly worked for Radio Free Europe, one of the five networks under the USAGM.

Authorship 
In addition to his television activities, Falahati has published his poems. He is also familiar with Indian language and has translated Pritish Nandy poems into Persian.

References

External links 
 

Living people
1958 births
Iranian television personalities
20th-century Iranian poets
Iranian translators
Iranian radio and television presenters
Iranian emigrants to the United States
Iranian expatriates in the United States
Iranian dissidents
Iranian whistleblowers
21st-century Iranian poets